Ryan Gabrielson is an American investigative journalist. He has won a George Polk Award, and Pulitzer Prize for Local Reporting.

Education
He graduated from the University of Arizona.

Career
Gabrielson began his career in journalism at The Monitor in McAllen, Texas. He reported for the East Valley Tribune in Mesa, Arizona. In 2009 and 2010 he was a fellow in the Investigative Reporting Program at University of California, Berkeley Graduate School of Journalism, which supports investigative reporters "in an era of cutbacks at major news organizations". He is currently working for California Watch and the Center for Investigative Reporting as a public safety reporter. Gabrielson reported on an in-house police force at California's board-and-care institutions for the disabled. Through this work, he exposed how officers "routinely failed to do basic work on criminal cases" such as suspicious deaths.

For the East Valley Tribune in 2008, Gabrielson and Paul Giblin investigated the immigration-enforcement operations of the Maricopa County Sheriff's Office. For this investigation, they won the 2009 Pulitzer Prize for Local Reporting which cited "their adroit use of limited resources to reveal, in print and online, how a popular sheriff's focus on immigration enforcement endangered investigation of violent crime and other aspects of public safety." (Giblin had been laid off in Tribune cutbacks at the turn of the year, and Gabrielson announced his departure for the Berkeley fellowship in the summer.)

An associate of a top official at the Maricopa County Sheriff's Department in 2014 unsuccessfully sued Gabrielson for defamation.

Awards
 2008 George Polk Award
 2009 Pulitzer Prize  
Online Journalism Award for investigative reporting
 Sigma Delta Chi Award

References

External links
"Logan Symposium: How the Sausage Is Made? (Journalists)", Berkeley Graduate School of Journalism

American male journalists
Pulitzer Prize for Local Reporting winners
George Polk Award recipients
University of Arizona alumni
University of California, Berkeley Graduate School of Journalism faculty
Living people
Year of birth missing (living people)
Place of birth missing (living people)
UC Berkeley Graduate School of Journalism alumni
Livingston Award winners for National Reporting